The Boecis (original name: Lo poema de Boecis, ; "The poem of Boethius") is an anonymous fragment written around the year 1000 CE in the Limousin dialect of Old Occitan, currently spoken only in southern France. Of the possibly hundreds or thousands of original lines, only 257 are now known.

This poem was inspired by the work De consolatione philosophiae of the Latin poet, philosopher and politician Boethius (~480-524).

Fragments
Laisses 23 to 28:

XXIII

XXIV

XXV

XXVII

XXVIII

Notes

Further reading
Cropp, G.M. "The Occitan Boecis, the Medieval French Tradition of the Consolatio Philosophiae and Philosophy's Gown." In Études de langue et de littérature médiévales offertes à Peter T. Ricketts, ed. D. Billy and A. Buckley. Turnhout, 2005. pp. 255–66.
Lavaud, R. and G. Machicot (eds.). Boecis, Poème sur Boèce (fragment). Toulouse, 1950.
Schwarze, C. (ed.). Der altprovenzalische Boeci. Forschungen zur romanischen Philologie 12. Münster, 1963.

External links
Full text in Old Occitan
Université de la Sorbonne
CRDP Montpelhièr

Medieval poetry
Occitan literature